Peloroses is a genus of moths in the family Erebidae. It is monotypic, being represented by the single species, Peloroses praestans.

References

Lymantriinae
Monotypic moth genera